Forestry literature is the books, journals and other publications about forestry.

The first major works about forestry in the English language included Roger Taverner's Booke of Survey (1565), John Manwood's A Brefe Collection of the Lawes of the Forrest (1592) and John Evelyn's Sylva (1662).

See also
List of forestry journals

References

Forestry